Don Shepard Park is a baseball park located in Brownwood, TX and home to the Howard Payne University Yellowjackets baseball team of the American Southwest Conference. The venue underwent upgrades in the fall of 2008 estimated to be at the expense of $30,000.

References

Baseball venues in Texas